Nouakchott-Sud (South Nouakchott) is a region in Mauritania. It comprises the three southern departments of Mauritania's capital city Nouakchott: Arafat, El Mina and Riyad. Its headquarters are at Arafat and Nouakchott's deep-water port is located within its borders.

Nouakchott-Sud was created on 25 November 2014 when the region of Nouakchott was split into three new regions. Its wāli or governor is Rabbou Ould Bounenna.

References

Nouakchott
Regions of Mauritania
States and territories established in 2014
2014 establishments in Mauritania